Ku or , collectively refers to the traditional Chinese trousers in  in the broad sense.  can also refer to the , which are Chinese trousers without a rise as opposed to the trousers with a rise, referred as  or  in ancient times.

With time, the Chinese trousers evolved and changed in a variety of shapes and styles.

Terminology 
As a general term, the term  and  can both be literally translated as "trousers or pants" in English language. The term  refers to shorts.

/  
In a Qin dynasty manuscript called 《制衣》(), however, Chinese trousers, including , are recorded as 

/  

In the Spring and Autumn period and Han dynasty, trousers without crotches were called . The term  can also be found in the ancient texts, such as in the Western Han dynasty text called  《方言 》by Yang Xiong, and in the chapter 《小爾雅》of the  dating from the Eastern Han to Three Kingdoms period.

History

Pre-Warring States period 
The  was worn in China since the neolithic times, where it was called . The  was the earliest form of in China and only covered the shank of its wearer. The  consisted of two separated legs which were tied on calves and allowed to exposure of the thighs. As a result, a wrap-skirt had to be worn to hide the lower body and the crotch area. The  was also used to protect its wearer from the cold and to protect its wearer's skin. In the Spring and Autumn period, trousers without crotches were still in use.

Warring States period, Qin dynasty 

The Warring States period marks the beginning of the history of  through the  policy adopted by King Wuling of Zhao. Through the  policy, the -style  with loose rise was introduced in Central China and first adopted and used by the military troops before eventually being used by the general populations in the succeeding dynasties. Since the rear and the rise of the  trousers were both opened, a skirt continued to be worn to hide the genitals. An example of a typical form of  trousers is the embroidered silk brocade  discovered in the  Chu tomb in Jiangling, Hubei province.

While new forms of  trousers were developed, the -style  continued to be worn until the early Han dynasty.

Han dynasty 

There were variety of trousers in the Han dynasty, including full trousers with tampered cuffs. The  attire was worn by men in ordinary times.

Wei, Jin, Northern and Southern dynasties 

In the early Six dynasties period, the trousers which were worn by commoners were similar to those worn in the Han dynasty having full legs with tapered cuffs. Male commoners continued to wore it in their  while female commoners could either wore it in their  or under their . In the Jin dynasty, clothing did not change much and trousers were worn by servants and people with low status. 

By binding the trousers below the knees, the  would facilitate movements, including when horseback riding or when men were on duty. The chord used to bind the knees were made out of felt in the Western Jin; however, as the use of felt was a product of the Eurasian steppes; it was assumed to be  by the contemporary observers of this period. In the Northern Wei, some women started to wear  instead of skirts under the influence of the northern nomads. The  was a popular form of attire until the Sui and Tang dynasties.

Sui and Tang dynasties 

The  became popular amongst women who wore it under their skirt. New form of trousers then appeared with narrow legs instead of loose legs.

Song dynasty and Yuan dynasty 

Trousers with narrow legs, called , were worn by the general population.

The , a -style , first appeared in the Song dynasty. It became so popular that it was occasionally worn by the Emperors. The  remained popular in the Yuan dynasty.

Ming dynasty 

In the Ming dynasty,  evolved into another -style  called ; the  however had to be worn over other forms of trousers.

Qing dynasty

21st century

Ethnic clothing 

Derivatives and influences 

 

See also

Notes

References 

Chinese traditional clothing